Hamish Hugh Macdonald (born 11 January 1947) is a former New Zealand rugby union player. A lock, Macdonald represented Poverty Bay, Canterbury, and North Auckland at a provincial level, and was a member of the New Zealand national side, the All Blacks, from 1972 to 1976. He played 48 matches for the All Blacks including 12 internationals.

References

1947 births
Living people
People from the Hokianga
People educated at King's College, Auckland
New Zealand rugby union players
New Zealand international rugby union players
Poverty Bay rugby union players
Canterbury rugby union players
Northland rugby union players
Rugby union locks
Rugby union players from the Northland Region